Operation Sunset Beach was an operation conducted by the 2nd Brigade, 25th Infantry Division in Hậu Nghĩa Province, southeastern Tây Ninh Province and southwestern Bình Dương Province, lasting from 2 September to 11 October 1966.

Prelude
Operation Sunset Beach was planned as a security operation intended to engage Viet Cong forces before the South Vietnamese national elections scheduled for 11 September 1966.

Operation
The 2nd Brigade conducted a series of air and ground assaults across the operational area together with Army of the Republic of Vietnam forces, before withdrawing to base camps several days before the elections to avoid accusations of interference.

On 20 September the 1st Battalion, 5th Infantry Regiment (Mechanized) conducted a sweep of the Boi Loi Woods, meeting sporadic resistance and destroying 
bunkers and supplies.

Aftermath
Operation Sunset Beach officially concluded on 11 October, with US reports claiming that Viet Cong losses were 80 killed (body count) and a further 135 estimated killed, U.S. losses were 29 killed.

References

Conflicts in 1966
1966 in Vietnam
Battles involving the United States
Battles involving Vietnam
Battles and operations of the Vietnam War in 1966
History of Bình Dương province
History of Bình Phước Province
History of Long An Province